Wladimir Wertelecki is a Pediatrician and Medical Geneticist who in 1974 established one of the first free-standing Departments of  Medical Genetics at the new South Alabama University College of Medicine in Mobile, Alabama, U.S.A. Since 1996 and following his retirement as Chairman and Emeritus Professor of Medical Genetics, Pediatrics and Pathology, he continues his investigations of developmental anomalies and their prevention as Project Scientist at the Department of Pediatrics, University of California San Diego. Since 1996, his research focused mainly on alcohol and ionizing radiation impacts on congenital anomalies. He is the author over 135 scientific reports. In 2000, he established the OMNI-Net Ukraine Programs to investigate reproductive risks posed by exposures to alcohol and Chornobyl ionizing radiation. OMNI-Net Ukraine established a population-based registry for the epidemiological surveillance of congenital anomalies and qualified to become full member of EUROCAT, a network of over 38 such registries across Europe.  OMNI-Net Ukraine is the sole full member of EUROCAT conducting such investigations in regions formerly ruled by the USSR. OMNI-Net Ukraine also implements a variety of collaborative investigations with experts from the UCSD, Emory and other Universities sponsored by the Collaborative Initiative on Fetal Alcohol Spectrum Disorders (CIFASD) funded by then National Institute on Alcohol Abuse and Alcoholism (NIH). Many components of the OMNI-Net Ukraine programs introduced by Wertelecki, were previously implemented in Alabama. He established a regional network of clinics across southern Alabama and West Florida and in 1978 organized the Southern Genetic Group which expanded into the South-Eastern Regional Genetics Group enhancing genetic services in six states. Wertelecki also contributed to the efforts by local Native-Americans to gain Federal Recognition as Native-Americans in Alabama. In 1992, he made a presentation to the US Senate regarding the reproductive risks posed by the Chornobyl radiation. Following an initial sponsorship by USAID, he established OMNI-Net programs in Ukraine, a not-for-profit network to provide training and to engage Ukrainian professionals to conduct monitoring of the frequency of birth defects. OMNI-Net teams promptly detected an epidemic of spina bifida and associated malformations collectively known as neural tube defects (NTD). The frequency of these malformations and the associated child mortality are persistently the highest in Europe. From the start, OMNI-Net advocates for Ukrainian authorities to introduce folic acid fortification programs, a measure that will significantly reduce the epidemic and related mortality. Flour fortification with folic acid is safe, effective and affordable as shown by implementations adopted by 80 countries. Currently (July 2021), a legislative initiative to establish an NTD prevention program is under consideration by the Ukrainian National Parliament. OMNI-Net has also documented that thousands of pregnant women continue to accumulate in their bodies, through eating, drinking, and inhaling, radioactive elements (nuclides). Whole body counts of incorporated Cs-137 (radioactive cesium) by pregnant women are much higher than in women residing away from Chornobyl radiation impacted regions. OMNI-Net teams seek national and international partners to elucidate the inherent risks of such facts. Although some reports state that Chornobyl radiation is not biologically harmful, OMNI-Net researchers note that such studies did not include pregnant women with known levels of incorporated nuclides. The association of incorporated levels of Cs-137 with prevalence of birth defects remains to be clarified. Another frequent known cause of birth defects in Ukraine is alcohol consumption by pregnant women. Since 2006, OMNI-Net has implemented an international initiative (CIFASD) focused on fetal alcohol spectrum disorders. In summary, OMNI-Net is effectively a catalist for joint scientific collaborations of Ukrainian and International investigations.

Professional life narrative 
Wertelecki initiated his medical education in 1955 at the School of Medicine of the University of Buenos Aires. As a student of medical basics, he undertook additional studies to qualify as a teaching assistant in human anatomy (1957) and in physiology (1958). These extra-curricular engagements were formative. His engagement with anatomy led to the observation of an instance of an anatomic atavism (“maneus muscle”) which stimulated his interest in anatomical variants, anomalies, and evolution. His interest in physiology opened an opportunity for him to join a research team headed by Dr. Virgilio G. Foglia, an expert in the experimental production of diabetes in the rat. This team, one of several, were coordinated by Dr. Bernardo Houssay, a Nobel Prize winner, and were dedicated to define factors regulating blood sugar, pre-diabetes, diabetes, and their impacts on embryonal development. Wertelecki's first scientific reports concerned reproductive impacts and birth weights. As a student of clinical medicine, Wertelecki was granted a University scholarship and became an assistant to Dr. Niceto S. Loizaga, an expert in Semiology (skills to recognize signs as signals of syndromes and diagnoses) (1958-1961). Wertelecki's task, among other, was the coordination of a clinic caring for Down syndrome patients, then referred to as “Mongolism”. This experience added to his interest in Genetics and birth defects, which prompted him to seek further training in the United States (1991). After completing a rotating internship (1962-1963), he became a pediatric resident (1963-1965) at the Department of Pediatrics, St. Louis Children's Hospital and Washington University headed by Dr. Alexis F. Hartmann, one of the first to use insulin to treat diabetic children. During his residency, his semiology skills led to his first scientific report in the U.S. - recognition of cantharidin poisoning of children. Wertelecki's sought further training in Clinical Genetics as a fellow at the Boston Children's Hospital and Harvard Medical School (1965-1968). His tasks included participation in the Phenylketonuria Treatment clinic and the development of computer-aided programs to gather family reproductive histories. His publications include the recognition and significance of partial loss of a segment of chromosome 18 (contradicting the presumption that such events are lethal). Another report concerned computer-aided role of gathering family reproductive histories.  During 1968-1970, Wertelecki studied clinical epidemiology while serving as a Senior Surgeon (Commander) of the US Public Health Corp at the Epidemiology Branch of the National Cancer Institute) and consultant in Medical Genetics at the Naval National Medical Center in Bethesda, Maryland. Having access to computerized medical records and to the National Institutes of Health Clinics, he demonstrated that therapies prescribed to epileptic women had children with higher frequency of facial clefts, and that leukemia were unduly heavier at birth. He also analyzed the fingertip ridged skin patterns of leukemic children. The complexities of these investigations and analyses, led Wertelecki to incorporate perspectives of distinguished advisors and collaborators, including Mr. Nathan Mantel after whom a statistical test is named, Dr. Robert W. Miller who defined provocative associations of particular birth defects with particular cancers. Regarding dermal ridges, Wertelecki formed a life-long partnership with Dr. C.C. Plato, a pioneer of Dermatoglyphics, a discipline dedicated to the study of dermal (volar skin) ridges. The cited investigations also led Wertelecki toward another life-long association with Dr. Josef Warkany, considered the main pioneer and founder of the Teratology Society dedicated to the study of birth defects.

In 1971, Wertelecki became an Assistant Professor, and in 1972 an Associate Professor of Pediatrics and Pathology at the Medical University of South Carolina. A report of the characteristics of Triploidy syndrome reflects his interest in Semiology and medical students - the medical student co-author is a recognized authority in Medical Genetics (JG). In 1974, Wertelecki joined the University of South Alabama Medical University, a newly established institution. His main task was to establish a free-standing Department of Medical Genetics, arguably amongst the first in the country. He recruited as Distinguished Visiting Progressors, Drs. J. Warkany and H. Zellweger, both recognized as world leaders of pediatrics and advocates of preventive public health policies. In 1978, Wertelecki was the prime organizer of the Southeastern Regional Genetics Group (SERG) dedicated to coordinate regional resources and clinical services along with initiatives to promote computer-driven data collection of genetic services. His department became an accredited site for the training of physicians in Clinical Genetics and Clinical Cytogenetics. In addition to U.S. graduates, international trainees included those from Japan, Argentina, Brazil, Sri Lanka, China, India, among others.

In 1986, the impact of the Chornobyl disaster on Wertelecki was considerable. He noted that during the International Congress of Human Genetics of 1986 and 1991, the attention to potential Chornobyl ionizing radiation impacts on human embryos was modest. In 1992, Wertelecki was invited to address a U.S. Senate Committee regarding Chernobyl and child health. In 1996, he was the recipient of a small grant from the Child Health to organize a Symposium to take place during the Human Genetics International Congress of 1996 on the subject of Chornobyl radiation impacts on child development. The participating International experts, including from Belarus and Ukraine, defined areas of concern and potential investigations. Wertelecki sought further advice from John William Gofman (Professor Emeritus of Molecular and Cell Biology at University of California at Berkeley), Daniel Carleton Gajdusek (Pediatrician winner of the Nobel Prize for the discovery of the human prion disease), Jennifer L Howse (President of the March of Dimes Foundation), Mike Katz (Vice-President for Science, March of Dimes Foundation), Godfrey Oakley (Director of the Division of Birth Defects of the U.S. Centers for Disease Control and Prevention), among others. In 1999, a plan to establish a population based monitoring of birth defects upholding international standards in several regions of Ukraine was submitted and approved by the Ukrainian Ministry of Health, Wertelecki accepted to be the director of the project now referred to as OMNI-Net Ukraine Programs. In 2000, with initial support from the USAID, population surveillance of birth defects monitoring was initiated and in 2002, OMNI-Net data documented a high frequency of spina bifida, which persists to the present.  Since then, OMNI-Net members advocate for the introduction of mandatory fortification of flour with folic acid to reduce spina bifida and related disorders by at least 50%.

In 2006, OMNI-Net qualified for full membership of the European birth defects monitoring network (EUROCAT) and became a participant in the Collaborative Initiative of Fetal Alcohol Spectrum Consortium (CIFASD) In 2021, OMNI-Net restarted a Spina Bifida – Hydrocephalus prevention initiative by petitions to the President and Prime Minister to introduce folic acid mandatory fortification of flour in Ukraine. This narrative is further illustrated by an annotated bibliography of peer reviewed scientific reports and other creative publications by Wertelecki and OMNI-Net members which by May 2021 approach 190 in number.

Honors and awards 
Amond others:

 1988 SERGG South-Eastern Regional Genetics Group (Recognition).
1989 Humanitarian Award, Mobile Association for Retarded Citizens.
1992 Foreign Corresponding Member of Academy of Medicine, Buenos Aires, Argentina.
1998 Honorary Professor, Kharkov State University, School of Medicine.
1998 Distinguished Service Award, American Dermatoglyphics Association.
1999 Franklin Smith Award for Distinguished Service, State of Alabama.
2003 Foreign Member of the National Academy of Sciences, Ukraine. 
2003 Doctor Honoris Causa, National University of Kyiv-Mohyla Academy, Ukraine.
2010 Doctor Honoris Causa, Lviv Medical University, Ukraine.
2016 Distinguished Service Award by the University of South Alabama Medical Alumni Association.

Organizations 
Among others, past and current:

 American College of Medical Genetics and Genomics
 American Society of Pediatrics and Pediatric Research (Emeritus)
 American Academy of Pediatrics
The Teratology Society
Academia Nacional de Medicina (Argentina)
National Academy of Sciences of Ukraine
American Public Health Association

Selected scientific publications 
(among others, for complete bibliography please see PubMed )

Selected early publications 
Foglia, V.G., Fernandez-Collazo, E.L., Wesley, O.R., Wertelecki, W., Granillo, R.: Trastornos de la Reproduccion de La Rata Macho Diabetica.  Rev. Soc. Argent. Biol. 37:127 (1961).

Wertelecki, W., Lawton, T.J.:  A Computer Program for Gathering Family History.  Eighth IBM Medical Symposium, p. 165 (1967).

Most recent publications 

Bandoli G, Coles CD, Kable JA, Wertelecki W, Yevtushok L, Zymak-Zakutnya N, Wells A, Granovska IV, Pashtepa AO, Chambers CD; CIFASD. Patterns of Prenatal Alcohol Use That Predict Infant Growth and Development. Pediatrics. 2019 Feb;143(2). pii: e20182399. doi: 10.1542/peds.2018-2399. Epub 2019 Jan 4. PubMed PMID 30610099; PubMed Central PMCID: PMC6361345.
 Sarkar DK, Gangisetty O, Wozniak JR, Eckerle JK, Georgieff MK, Foroud TM, Wetherill L, Wertelecki W, Chambers CD, Riley E, Zymak-Zakutnya N, Yevtushok L. Persistent Changes in Stress-Regulatory Genes in Pregnant Women or Children Exposed Prenatally to Alcohol. Alcohol Clin Exp Res. 2019 Sep;43(9):1887-1897. doi: 10.1111/acer.14148. Epub 2019 Aug 6. PubMed PMID 31329297; PubMed Central PMCID: PMC6722014.
 Bakker MK, Kancherla V, Canfield MA, Bermejo-Sanchez E, Cragan JD, Dastgiri S, De Walle HEK, Feldkamp ML, Groisman B, Gatt M, Hurtado-Villa P, Kallen K, Landau D, Lelong N, Lopez Camelo JS, Martínez L, Morgan M, Mutchinick OM, Nembhard WN, Pierini A, Rissmann A, Sipek A, Szabova E, Tagliabue G, Wertelecki W, Zarante I, Mastroiacovo P. Analysis of Mortality among Neonates and Children with Spina Bifida: An International Registry-Based Study, 2001-2012. Paediatr Perinat Epidemiol. 2019 Nov;33(6):436-448. doi: 10.1111/ppe.12589. Epub 2019 Oct 21. PubMed PMID 31637749.
 Wertelecki W. Josef Warkany's gestation of the teratology  society. Birth Defects Res. 2020 Jul 15;112(12):885-889. doi: 10.1002/bdr2.1684. PMID 32686352.
 Bandoli G, Jones K, Wertelecki W, Yevtushok L, Zymak-Zakutnya N, Granovska I, Plotka L, Chambers C; CIFASD. Patterns of Prenatal Alcohol Exposure and Alcohol-Related Dysmorphic Features. Alcohol Clin Exp Res. 2020 Oct;44(10):2045-2052. doi: 10.1111/acer.14430. Epub 2020 Sep 6. PMID 32772389; PMCID: PMC7722075.
 Kable JA, Coles CD, Jones KL, Yevtushok L, Kulikovsky Y, Zymak-Zakutnya N, Dubchak I, Akhmedzhanova D, Wertelecki W, Chambers CD; CIFASD. Infant Cardiac Orienting Responses Predict Later FASD in the Preschool Period. Alcohol Clin Exp Res. 2021 Feb;45(2):386-394. doi: 10.1111/acer.14525. Epub 2021 Jan 6. PMID 33277942; PMCID: PMC7887046.
 Wertelecki W. Chornobyl radiation-congenital anomalies: A persisting dilemma. Congenit Anom (Kyoto). 2021 Jan;61(1):9-13. doi: 10.1111/cga.12388. Epub 2020 Aug 19. PMID 33405251.
 Patskun E, Yevtushok L, Zymak-Zakutnia N, Lapchenko S, Akhmedzhanova D, Wertelecki W. A teratology information system in vernacular: Closing an information gap. Birth Defects Res. 2021 Apr 24. doi: 10.1002/bdr2.1901. Epub ahead of print. PMID 33893758.
 Coles CD, Kable JA, Granovska IV, Pashtepa AO, Wertelecki W, Chambers CD; CIFASD. Measurement of neurodevelopmental effects of prenatal alcohol exposure in Ukrainian preschool children. Child Neuropsychol. 2021 May 13:1-16. doi: 10.1080/09297049.2021.1919298. Epub ahead of print. PMID 33982636.

Books, chapters and other publications (partial list) 

 Wertelecki, W., Lawton, T., Gerald, P.S.:  Computer-Based Patient Interviewing.  In:  Computer-Assisted Instruction in the Health Professions.  Eds., Stolurow, L.M., Peterson, T.I., Cunningham, A.C., Entelek, Inc., Newburyport, MA (1970).
 Wertelecki, W., Peterson, R.D.A.: Primary Immunodeficiency Syndromes. In:  Surgical Immunology.  Ed., Munster, A.M., Grune Publishers, New York, NY (1976).
 Wertelecki, W.:  Regional Rural Genetics Program:  Educational Considerations.  In: The Management of Genetic Disorders. Eds., Bartsocas, C.S., Papadatos, C., Alan R. Liss Publishers, New York, NY (1979).
 Wertelecki, W., Plato, C., Editors:  Dermatoglyphics – 50 Years Later.  (Birth Defects Original Article Series Vol. XV, No. 6).  Alan R. Liss Publishers, New York, NY (1979).
 Wertelecki, W.: Tetraploidy.  In: Handbook of Clinical Neurology, Neurogenetic Directory.  Ed., Myrianthopoulas, N.C., Part II, North-Holland Publishing Co., Amsterdam (1982).
 Castilla, E., Penchaszadeh, V., Wertelecki, W., Youlton, R.:  Prevention and Control of Genetic Diseases and Congenital Defects:  Report of an Advisory Group.  Pan American Health Organization/World Health Organization, 525 Twenty-Third  Street, Washington, D.C., Scientific Publication No. 460 (1984).
 Wertelecki, W.:  Roberts Syndrome.  Birth Defects Encyclopedia, 3rd Edition, Buyse, M.L., Editor. Blackwell/Year Book Medical Publishers, Inc.  pp. 1498-1499 (1990).
 Wertelecki, W.:  Chromosome 22.  Birth Defects Encyclopedia, 3rd Edition, Buyse, M.L., Editor. Blackwell/Year Book Medical Publishers, Inc.  pp. 395 (1990).
 Wertelecki, W.:  A Regional Genetics Program in Alabama with Emphasis on Education and Clinicians - Achievements and Experience.  In: Medical Genetics and Society. Eds., Fujiki, N., Bulyzhenkov, V., Bankowski, Z., Kugler Publications, Amsterdam/New York, (1991).
 Wertelecki, W.:  Diagnosis of NF-2.  In: Neurofibromatosis 2.  Eds., Cohen, B.R. Korf, B.H., Pugh, J.N., The National Neurofibromatosis Foundation, Inc., New York, NY (1992).
 Wertelecki, W.:  Clinical Dermatoglyphics.  In: Human Malformations and Related Anomalies, Eds., Stevenson, R.E., Editor.  Oxford University Press, Inc.  (1993).
 Wertelecki W.: Congenital Malformations in Rivne, Ukraine. 119-138. In: Crisis Without End: The Medical and Ecological Consequences of the Fukushima Nuclear Catastrophe. Helen Caldicott, editor. New Press, The, Oct 21, 304 pages (2014).

Further listing omitted.

Current special projects 
Among others:

 Mandatory Folic Acid Flour Fortification in Ukraine 
 Prevention and Care of Spina Bifida and Related Disorders 
 Adolescence and Adult Developmental Patterns of Children with Fetal Alcohol Spectrum Disorders  
 Analyses of Cs-137 Incorporated Levels Trends 
 Distant Learning Modules 
 Parents and Public 
 Medical Students
 Health Care Providers
 Sustenance of Contents in Dedicated Websites
 Medications and the Unborn (http://utis.in.ua/)
 Clinical Signs – Eye Openers (https://ceo.medword.net/)
 Medical Terminology and Humanities (https://www.pandorawordbox.com/) 
 I.B.I.S. – International Birth Defects Information System (in short) (http://ibis-birthdefects.org/) 
 OMNI-Net Ukraine (http://ukraineomni.org/en/about_eng/)

External links 
Baryliak IR. Encyclopedia of Modern Ukraine - Vol.4, p. 278, Kyiv [in Ukrainian]
Wladimir Wertelecki [in Ukrainian] (last accessed Aug, 2017) - http://uacm.kharkov.ua/people/wertelecki-u.html
Birth Defects and Ukraine. Report by W. Wertelecki, M.D. - http://www.ibis-birthdefects.org/start/kievtxt.htm
Geneticist charts effects of nuclear disasters - http://blog.al.com/pr-community-news/2012/07/geneticist_charts_effects_of_n.html
Norton A. Higher birth-defect rate seen in Chernobyl area - https://www.reuters.com/article/us-defect-chernobyl/higher-birth-defect-rate-seen-in-chernobyl-area-idUSTRE62N4L820100324

References 

1936 births
Living people
Harvard Medical School faculty
People from Rivne
People from Wołyń Voivodeship (1921–1939)
Polish emigrants to Argentina
Argentine emigrants to the United States
University of Buenos Aires alumni
University of South Alabama faculty